Zinc finger, BED-type containing 6 is a protein that in humans is encoded by the ZBED6 gene.

References

Further reading